Langwathby is a railway station on the Settle and Carlisle Line, which runs between  and  via . It is owned by Network Rail and managed by Northern Trains.

History
The station was built by the Midland Railway and opened in 1876.  The station was designed by the Midland Railway company architect John Holloway Sanders. It closed when local stopping trains over the Settle-Carlisle Line were withdrawn in May 1970, but was reopened by British Rail in July 1986.

Stationmasters

Joseph Shaw 1876 - 1884
Thomas Wakefield 1884 - 1890 (afterwards station master at Lazonby)
Oliver John Haddock 1890 - 1892
William Dickinson 1892 - ca. 191
Harry Fell ca. 1930 ca. 1933
E.B. Thompson ca. 1936
F.J. Martin ca. 1958
Robert James Tinsley from 1959 (also station master at Little Salkeld)

Facilities

The Carlisle-bound (down) station building has been converted into the Brief Encounter Tea Rooms and an antique shop. An enclosed bus-shelter style waiting room has been provided at the Carlisle end of the platform (a stone shelter is also present on the Leeds-bound platform).  Step-free access is available to both platforms via ramps from the road below.  The station is unstaffed. Tickets can be bought at the station from a vending machine installed in 2019.  Train running information is available via timetable posters, digital information screens (also installed in 2019) or telephone.

Accidents and incidents
On 29 November 1912, goods guard R.Mallinson’s hand was crushed during shunting operations in the goods yard. He attempted to couple two waggons with his shunting pole when he slipped on some snow.
On 6 March 1930, a passenger train departed from  station against signals and was in collision with a ballast train. Two people were killed and four were seriously injured.

Services

Eight northbound and seven southbound services call at Langwathby on weekdays and five trains in each direction on Sundays.  The station is also served by a single DalesRail train from Preston & Blackpool North to Carlisle (and return) on Sundays during the summer months.  One additional call each way was instituted at the summer 2018 timetable change as part of DfT-mandated Northern franchise improvements.

Services through to Carlisle were suspended from 9 February 2016 (until March 2017) by a landslip at Eden Brow (near ), which destabilised the embankment on the eastern side of the railway where it passes through the Eden Gorge.  An emergency timetable was in operation, with trains only operating as far as Armathwaite (with a bus link to Carlisle) northbound and Appleby southbound until repairs were completed in the spring of 2017.  Following the successful completion of the repair work, the regular timetable resumed on 31 March 2017.

References

External links

 
 

Railway stations in Cumbria
DfT Category F2 stations
Former Midland Railway stations
Railway stations in Great Britain opened in 1876
Railway stations in Great Britain closed in 1970
Railway stations in Great Britain opened in 1986
Reopened railway stations in Great Britain
Northern franchise railway stations
Beeching closures in England
John Holloway Sanders railway stations
Langwathby